Star Bestsellers is an Indian anthology television series which aired on Star Plus from 17 July 1999 to 23 July 2000.

Writers and directors who worked in creating the episodes of the series include Anurag Kashyap, Tigmanshu Dhulia, Imtiaz Ali, Sriram Raghavan and Hansal Mehta.

Plot
The series aired different stories with each episode having a different story, director, and cast.

Episode list

Reception 
Devarshi Ghosh of Scroll found the episodes of varying quality and called it "a portal into the stories, sensibilities and aesthetics that our best filmmakers were occupied with at the turn of the millennium".

References

External links
 Star Bestsellers on Hotstar

StarPlus original programming
Indian drama television series
1999 Indian television series debuts
2000 Indian television series endings
Indian anthology television series